PSG1 may refer to:
PSG1 (gene)
Heckler & Koch PSG1, a rifle